Eugene Withers (January 22, 1867 – June 1, 1925) was a lawyer and politician who served in both the Virginia House of Delegates and Virginia Senate, representing Pittsylvania County and Danville. He was also a delegate to the Virginia Constitutional Convention of 1902.

References

External links

1867 births
1925 deaths
Democratic Party Virginia state senators
19th-century American politicians
19th-century American lawyers
Virginia lawyers